The 2019 Fukuoka International Women's Cup was a professional tennis tournament played on outdoor carpet courts. It was the nineteenth edition of the tournament which was part of the 2019 ITF Women's World Tennis Tour. It took place in Fukuoka, Japan between 6 and 12 May 2019.

Singles main-draw entrants

Seeds

 1 Rankings are as of 29 April 2019.

Other entrants
The following players received wildcards into the singles main draw:
  Mana Ayukawa
  Kanako Morisaki
  Yuki Naito
  Moyuka Uchijima

The following players received entry from the qualifying draw:
  Shiho Akita
  Emina Bektas
  Mai Hontama
  Leonie Küng
  Himeno Sakatsume
  Ena Shibahara

Champions

Singles

 Heather Watson def.  Zarina Diyas, 7–6(7–1), 7–6(7–4)

Doubles

 Naomi Broady /  Heather Watson def.  Kristie Ahn /  Alison Bai, walkover

References

External links
 2019 Fukuoka International Women's Cup at ITFtennis.com
 Official website

2019 ITF Women's World Tennis Tour
2019 in Japanese women's sport
2019 in Japanese tennis
Fukuoka International Women's Cup